The Gothenburg School of Business, Economics and Law at the University of Gothenburg is one of Sweden's leading business schools, located in Gothenburg. It was founded in 1923 as an independent business college and is situated in the centre of the city. In 1961, it was integrated into the state-run university system, still as a separate college, but then was integrated into the University of Gothenburg in 1971.

The school is the only one in Sweden to hold the Triple Accreditation, i.e. AACSB, AMBA and EQUIS, certifying that all main activities are of the highest international standards.

Facilities 

The school moved to its present premises in central Gothenburg in 1952, the present buildings being inaugurated in 1995, with further work and extensions conducted in 1996, 2003 and 2010. The main campus offers approximately 25,500 square metres of space, hosting lecture halls and office space for faculty members, as well as library facilities, a restaurant and the premises of the school's Student Association.

Programmes 

Undergraduate level
 Programme in Business and Economics
 Bachelor Programme in Logistics Management
 Bachelor Programme in Environmental Social Science
The Social Analysis Programme
Master level (taught in English)
 Executive MBA
 Master in Accounting and Financial Management
 Master in Finance
 Master in Innovation and Industrial Management
 Master in International Business and Trade
 Master in Knowledge-based Entrepreneurship
 Master in Logistics and Transport Management
 Master in Management
 Master in Marketing and Consumption
 Master in Economics
 Master of Laws Programme (in Swedish)
PhD level
 PhD in Business Administration
 PhD in Economic Geography
 PhD in Innovation and Entrepreneurship and Intellectual Asset Management
 PhD in Law
 PhD in Economics
 PhD in Economic History
 PhD in Human Geography

The school was founded in 1923 as a private institution, serving a growing need for internationally oriented academic and professional education among the manufacturing companies, shipping firms and trading houses of Gothenburg. Gothenburg-based globally oriented companies, such as SKF, Volvo and the leading shipyards later became major employers of graduates from the school. After several decades of rapid growth in the Swedish economy and thus in the public system of higher education, the school became a public institution under Government auspices in 1960. After its amalgamation with the University of Gothenburg (the University) in 1971, it was recognised as an independent unit within the university in 1986. Since 1997, the school has had its own faculty board, reflecting a high degree of sovereignty within the university system. In 1992, the school expanded its activities by adding a Master of Laws programme to its educational options. Its present English name, ‘the School of Business, Economics and Law’, was adopted in 2004, so as to reflect its three main pillars of research and education.

Over the years, the development of the school has combined consistency and dynamism in a close relationship with the society surrounding it. The school's founders, in creating advanced higher education in Gothenburg, stressed the need for an academic base for the many local merchant firms engaged in overseas shipping and trade. Research conducted in close cooperation with the business community is essential to the school, and has been so since its foundation.

The international orientation of businesses headquartered or operating in the area contributes to the school's own international focus. Language courses were introduced at the school as far back as the early 1920s, and the emphasis on international business studies led to the creation of Sweden's oldest and largest Bachelor Programme in International Business and Economics, with French as one of the main subjects. Over the years, Spanish, German, Japanese, Chinese and English have been added as optional main languages to what is now known as the Programme in Business and Economics. The successive establishment of an extensive network of cooperation with foreign universities that today includes more than 150 agreements has furthermore strengthened the school's international orientation.

In 2006, the Swedish Government declared that the Bologna system was to be implemented for all higher education. Since 1997, the organisation of Master programmes in English has continued to develop into what today is formally known as the Graduate School, the unit for all education within the second cycle of the Bologna system today delivering nine two-year Master Programmes in Business and Economics.

The school grants degrees at all academic levels, and has comprehensive PhD programmes in all its disciplines. The Department of Business Administration – with a strong history of Management and Accounting research dating back to the 1920s – is one of the largest of its kind in the Nordic countries.
Today, the school's student body exceeds 4,000 full-time students. The faculty includes 272 researchers and teachers of whom 109 are full professors or associate professors.

The organisation of the school 
According to the organisational structure that was to be fully implemented by January 1, 2013, the school is organised into four departments:
 Business Administration
 Economics
 Law
 Economy and Society

The graduate school is an administrative entity outside the departments, with responsibility for the Executive MBA, Specialised Master Programmes, the Visiting Professor Programme and the school's GMAT Centre. The PhD programmes are the responsibility of the individual departments and not of the Graduate School.

The faculty board and the school management team 
The school's faculty board consists of three categories of members; senior management of the school, senior faculty (who form a majority), and representatives for the students and employees appointed by the student association and the trade unions respectively. The dean chairs the board. The faculty board has overall responsibility for:
 Long-term strategy of the school
 Funding and allocation of resources
 Staffing
 Programme options and content
 Research strategies
 Principles for quality assessment

The school management team comprises the dean, the assistant dean and the vice dean. The dean is individually responsible for the executive management of the school, answering to the vice-chancellor of the university. Internally, the dean is in charge of the school's strategy and its relationship with external stakeholders, and holds a formal operating responsibility with regards to staff, financial administration and infrastructure. The dean is also a member of the vice-chancellor's management council at the university level. The assistant dean holds the main responsibility for research and postgraduate education, while the vice dean is responsible for master and bachelor education. Both the dean and the assistant dean are elected by the school's members of faculty and administrators for a period of six years. The remaining elected members of the faculty board have a three-year mandate. Student and union representatives are appointed by the respective associations.

Advisory boards and committees 
To ascertain that all decision-making processes are based on a qualified analysis of correct facts, the school management team and faculty board is backed by a number of advisory committees and boards. The Swedish Government stipulates that all preparatory and decision-making bodies dealing with educational matters within Swedish universities must have student representation. Accordingly, the Student Association is represented on all these advisory bodies.
All vacant academic positions are publicly advertised internationally and candidates evaluated by external referees for proficiency and merit. An Appointments Board oversees the recruitment and evaluation process, with the final appointment decision being taken by the faculty board. Professors, who hold the highest academic position within the university, are formally appointed by the vice-chancellor following an application's adoption by the faculty board.
Research and education activities are discussed and coordinated through two separate preparatory committees. The Preparatory Committee for Research includes representatives from all departments, as well as one PhD student representative, and is responsible for developing common strategies for research, principles for the allocation of research resources between the departments, common principles for quality assessment, etc. The committee is chaired by the Assistant Dean. The Preparatory Committee for Education comprises representatives from all departments, major education units and programmes of the school, as well as one student representative, and handles all major questions regarding education at Bachelor and Master level. The committee is chaired by the Vice Dean.
The Advisory Board – made up of leading management executives from a wide variety of companies such as AB Volvo, Volvo Car Corporation, SKF and Stena, as well as the Swedish financial and public sectors – provides strategic advice to the school management team and practical support. It also functions as a key communication tool with some of the school's most important stakeholders. Some of the Advisory Board members are alumni of the school.

Research centres 
In addition to the main intra-disciplinary research groups within the departments, a long-term strategy by the school has also been to build up research capacity within more focused units that are organised multi-disciplinarily. Research centres have been initiated with the objective of promoting thinking outside the box, and at the same time facilitating active contacts with the business community in order to cooperate in dealing with applied research which is typical for a specific sector or a specific area.

 Centre for Business in Society
 Centre for Business Solutions
 Centre for Consumer Science
 Centre for Finance
 Centre for Global Human Resource Management
 Centre for Health Economics
 Centre for International Business Studies
 Centre for Regional Analysis
 Centre for Tourism
 Gothenburg Centre for Globalisation and Development

Researchers at the school are also active in cross-faculty centres hosted by other faculties, including:
 Business and Design Lab
 Centre for European Research (CERGU)
 Centre for Intellectual Property (CIP)
 Centre for Environment and Sustainability
 Lighthouse

Notable alumni 
 Per-Olov Atle (b. 1943), industry leader, board member of Bonnier.
 Percy Barnevik (b. 1941), industry leader, former CEO of Asea Brown Boveri and board member of GM
 Carl Bennet, (b. 1951), industry leader, major shareholder and chairman in Elanders, Getinge and Lifco.
 Nils Brunsson, academic and researcher in organizational behavior
 Jan Eliasson (b. 1940), diplomat, Swedish foreign minister
 Roger Holtback, (b. 1945), industry leader, former CEO of Volvo AB
 Lars Murman (b. 1957), Former CEO of Manpower
 Stig Nordfelt, (b. 1940), Accountant and consultant, board member of H&M and Capinordic Asset Management AB.
 Dan Sten Olsson, (b. 1947), industry leader, CEO of Stena AB and chairman in Concordia Maritime AB, Stena Line Holding B.V., Stena Metall AB, Stena Bulk AB, Stena Sessan AB, Stena Drilling Ltd. Also member of international advisory board of Alliance for Global Sustainability and honorary doctorate at the Chalmers University of Technology.
 Leif Pagrotsky (b. 1951), former Minister of Industry and Trade, Minister of Education, and Minister of Culture.
 Melker Schörling, (b. 1947), investor, major shareholder in Securitas AB and Assa Abloy. Also board member in
AarhusKarlshamn AB, Hexagon AB, Hexpol AB and Securitas AB. Chairman and owner of MSAB.
 Hans Wallenstam, (b. 1961), business magnate, CEO and major shareholder of Wallenstam.
 Leif Östling (b. 1945), industry leader, CEO of Scania AB. Holds also a Master of Engineering (Chalmers University of Technology, Gothenburg).
 Mats Wahlstrom, founder of Puro hospitality group

See also 
Stockholm School of Economics
Jönköping International Business School
Umeå School of Business
Lund School of Economics and Management
List of universities in Sweden
List of business schools in the Nordic countries

References 

Annual Report - The School of Business, Economics and Law 2011

External links 
School of Business, Economics and Law at Göteborg University - Official site

University of Gothenburg
Business schools in Sweden
Buildings and structures in Gothenburg
University departments in Sweden
1923 establishments in Sweden
Educational institutions established in 1923
Law schools in Sweden